Bilyaxia is a genus of beetles in the family Buprestidae, containing the following species:

 Bilyaxia bruchiana (Obenberger, 1928)
 Bilyaxia bucki (Cobos, 1956)
 Bilyaxia cinctipennis (Kerremans, 1913)
 Bilyaxia concinna (Mannerheim, 1837)
 Bilyaxia cordillerae (Obenberger, 1928)
 Bilyaxia cupriceps (Fairmaire & Germain, 1858)
 Bilyaxia descaprentriesi (Cobos, 1956)
 Bilyaxia emmanueli (Cobos, 1972)
 Bilyaxia maculicollis (Kerremans, 1887)
 Bilyaxia mariae (Cobos, 1956)
 Bilyaxia obscurata (Reed, 1873)
 Bilyaxia rubricollis (Moore, 1981)
 Bilyaxia willineri (Cobos, 1972)

References

Buprestidae genera